James Mason Owen (November 11, 1903 – July 12, 1972) served as mayor of Branson, Missouri, for 12 years. Jim Owen was an advertising manager for a Jefferson City newspaper before he came to the Ozarks in 1933 on a visit to Branson. He never left. Before he died in 1972, he had owned a drug store, movie theater and an auto dealership. He was president of a bank and wrote a fishing column for the Arkansas Gazette in Little Rock, AR. In addition, he owned champion fox hounds and bird dogs, produced his own brand of dog food, and owned a large dairy.

But Jim Owen became known for his other business venture—he set up the largest and most successful Ozark float fishing operation of that day. His success sparked national attention, giving area tourism a big boost.

Jim Owen also authored a book entitled: "Jim Owen's Hillbilly Humor" being the subject of articles in Look, Life, and The Saturday Evening Post where Jim shared his hilarious and heartwarming stories of life in the Ozarks.

It began in the spring of 1935 with six boats, six guides, and a big truck. Owen claimed he could provide 31 days of fishing in his area without ever covering the same water twice. He didn't know all there was to know about the river, but he knew more about promotion and advertising than any other man in the hills. He brought in as his guests the writers and editors who could give him the publicity he needed. They were given free trips with steaks and wine and all the comforts one could accomplish on an Ozark gravel bar. In no time, his float service was being plugged in the pages of Life, Look, Outdoor Life, and Sports Afield, plus dozens of large newspapers.

The late Dan Saults and Townsend Godsey were writers who knew Jim Owen. They left much information and insight concerning his float fishing business. They gave much of the credit for his success to his boat builder, Charlie Barnes, and guides Albert Cornett, Raymond Winch, Little Horse Jennings, Tom Yocum, and Deacon Hembree.

It was Owen who became the most widely know publicist for floating and fishing the Ozarks.  As Mayor of Branson for 12 years and disciple of the old scriptural admonition that “He who tooteth not his horn, the same shall not be tooted,” Owen regaled the media of the 1930s and 1940s with promotions about the beauty of the region and its outstanding fishing.  His Owen Boat Lines specialized in week floats from Galena on the lower James River down to Branson on the White River.

Owen is credited with Branson's first theater, the "Owen Theatre" built in 1936. It has proved to be a harbinger of things to come. The venue on Commercial Street in Historic Downtown Branson was called the Owen "Hillbilly" Theatre, and was initially built as a movie house to provide additional entertainment for the fishermen he took out for float trips on the White River and other tourists to the area. The theatre is now home to the Branson Regional Arts Council and provides high quality community theatre productions as well as a Conservatory of the Arts program for area youth to learn all aspects of the performing and visual arts.

References

External links 
 "Mozark Moments" 
 Owens' Theater-Branson's First 
 Biography: Jim Owen Boat Line 
 White River history lesson 
 Missouri Dept. of Conservation 
 

1903 births
1972 deaths
Mayors of places in Missouri
20th-century American politicians